David Aua is a Papua New Guinean former international footballer and current head coach who played as a goalkeeper.

References 

Living people
1983 births
Papua New Guinean footballers
Papua New Guinea international footballers
Association football goalkeepers
2002 OFC Nations Cup players